Ciao was a European-based online-shopping portal with websites in the United Kingdom, France, Spain, Germany, the Netherlands, Italy and Sweden. In February 2008, the company launched an American version of the site, Ciao.com. The site provided a forum where registered users could write reviews and give their opinions on a wide variety of products to help others make decisions.  These reviews were available to the general public to help consumers, but also rated by other Ciao users on their usefulness on a scale ranging from exceptional to off-topic. Up to December 2017, when a review was read by a member, the author had money added to their account. Members could also receive money through online surveys and referring friends. On 27 November 2017, Ciao announced that from 1 December all payments would be stopped. In February 2018, Ciao was closed down. Ciao was free to sign up for.

As well as offering reviews, the site also provided price comparison (working with merchants and agencies who provide data feeds) and allowed the user to click through and purchase products.

Ciao claims that it reached an audience of 28.4 million monthly unique visitors (ComScore, January 2013) in Europe.

Microsoft Purchases Ciao
Microsoft made an offer of $486 million in late August 2008 to purchase Greenfield Online, the owner of Ciao GmbH and Ciao, Inc. Representatives from Microsoft said the purchase was primarily made to boost the company's Internet search and e-commerce business in Europe.

LeGuide Group Acquires Ciao

Since the acquisition in March 2012, Ciao strengthens the portfolio of LeGuide Group (listed on Alternext board of NYSE Euronext Paris – ISIN code: FR0010146092), founded in 1998 and operating in 14 European countries through a multi-site strategy of online shopping guides, comparison websites, shopping search engines and platforms for consumer ratings. LeGuide Group surrounds a brand portfolio, including LeGuide.com, choozen, dooyoo.com, pikengo, shopwahl.de and Ciao. CEO of Shopping Guide GmbH and LeGuide Group is Olivier Sichel since July 2012.

Notes

External links
 Ciao UK

Reward websites
Review websites
Comparison shopping websites
Online retailers of the United Kingdom
Dutch-language websites
Online retailers of France
Online retailers of Germany
Online retailers of Sweden
Online retailers of Italy